Gömür (also, Gemyur, Gemyut, Gyumyur”, and Karabulag) is a village in the Davachi Rayon of Azerbaijan.

References 

Populated places in Shabran District